Pophouse Entertainment is a private entertainment company based in Stockholm, Sweden. The company creates, acquires, and develops brands in various related fields, such as music, podcasting, stage performance, and gaming. Pophouse invests in music rights, as well as other types of intellectual property in the entertainment industry. Founded in 2014 by Conni Jonsson and Björn Ulvaeus, it has since been affiliated with many of Sweden's most notable entertainment brands including ABBA, Swedish House Mafia and Avicii, among others. Per Sundin currently serves as the group's CEO.

History
Pophouse Entertainment (also known as Pophouse) was established in 2014 in Stockholm, Sweden by Björn Ulvaeus, a founding member of the musical group ABBA, and  Conni Jonsson, founder of EQT Partners. Since 2019, the CEO of Pophouse is Per Sundin, who was previously CEO of Universal Music in the Nordics and was instrumental in the emergence of Spotify, as the first music label executive to partner with the streaming platform.

On February 25, 2022, the company opened  Avicii Experience, an interactive museum in Stockholm, and a tribute to Tim Bergling's music and life. The opening ceremony was inaugurated by the Swedish royal family.

In March 2022, Pophouse Entertainment acquired the master recordings of Swedish House Mafia musical band.

In April 2022, Pophouse recruited James Mcknight, previously Creative director of the Harry Potter franchise, as head of entertainment research and development for Pophouse, and also opened their first office in London.

Funding and acquisitions
In September 2021, the company bought Perfect Day Media AB, a media house founded in 2011, that develops and produces podcasts for various media platforms.

In 2022, Pophouse announced they would move into music catalog investments. According to Bloomberg, "Pophouse is raising a music fund with a target size of up to $1 billion USD, similar to that of Hipgnosis and Round Hill Music Royalty Fund. However, Pophouse has not yet confirmed that claim."

Pophouse was among the major developers of ‘ABBA Voyage’, a concert residency by the Swedish pop group ABBA. The concerts feature ABBA as virtual avatars (dubbed 'ABBAtars'), depicting the group as they appeared in 1979. The concerts are held in a purpose-built venue at the Queen Elizabeth Olympic Park in London, officially called ABBA Arena.

Notable projects and collaborations
ABBA Voyage
Swedish House Mafia
Avicii Experience
Space
Perfect Day Media
Mamma Mia The Party
Pippi at the Cirkus
ABBA The Museum
Fat Cat brasserie

Key people
Per Sundin - CEO (previously CEO of Universal Music Sweden and Nordics)
Johan Lagerlöf - Managing Partner of the Investments Division (previously, founder and CEO of X5 Music Group)
Catherine Powell - Board of Directors (currently also serving as head of hosting at Airbnb)
Steve Barnett (music executive) - Investment Advisory Committee (previously CEO and chairman of Capitol Records and Columbia Records)

References

Entertainment companies of Sweden
Mass media companies of Sweden
Swedish companies established in 2014
Companies based in Stockholm